
Ricoh is a Japanese multinational imaging and electronics company.

Ricoh may also refer to:

 Ricoh Arena, Coventry, England, a complex which includes a sports stadium, an exhibition hall, a hotel and a casino
 Ricoh Arena railway station
 Ricoh Astronauts, a former name of Amsterdam Basketball, a professional club
 Ricoh Black Rams, a Japanese rugby union team
 Ricoh Coliseum, Toronto, Canada, an arena used for agricultural displays, ice hockey and trade shows
 Ricoh Cup, a Zhongguo Qiyuan Go competition in China
 Ricoh Open, a former name of Rosmalen Grass Court Championships, a tennis competition
 Ricoh Xinxiu Cup, a Go competition in China

See also

Ricoh manufactures
 Ricoh 2A03, an 8-bit microprocessor in the Nintendo Entertainment System video game console
 Ricoh 500, an optical camera
 Ricoh 5A22, a microprocessor for the Super Nintendo Entertainment System video game console
 Ricoh Caplio 400G Wide, a digital camera
 Ricoh Caplio 500SE, a digital camera
 Ricoh Caplio G3, a digital camera
 Ricoh Caplio R3, a digital camera
 Ricoh Caplio RX, a digital camera
 Ricoh CX1, a digital camera
 Ricoh G700, a digital camera
 [[Ricoh GR Digital, a digital camera
 Ricoh GR Digital II, a digital camera
 Ricoh GR digital cameras
 Ricoh GR and GR II, digital cameras
 Ricoh GR film cameras, optical cameras
 Ricoh GXR, a digital camera
 Ricoh Synchrofax, a dictating machine
 Ricoh WG-4, a digital camera
 Ricoh WG-20, a digital camera
 Ricoh WG-30, a digital camera
 Ricoh WG-M1, a digital camera
 Ricoh XR-P, an optical camera

Other
 Stewart Organization, Inc. v. Ricoh Corp., a United States Supreme Court case